The 2004 VCU Rams men's soccer team represented Virginia Commonwealth University in all 2004 NCAA Division I men's college soccer competitions.

The 2004 season saw the Rams make their deepest-ever run in the NCAA Division I Men's Soccer Tournament, reaching the quarterfinals of the competition, before losing to eventual national runners-up, UC Santa Barbara. During their quarterfinal run, the Rams knocked off Atlantic 10 Men's Soccer Tournament champions, George Washington, and the number one team in the country, Wake Forest. Outside of NCAA play, the Rams won the Colonial Athletic Association regular season title. It would not be until 2018 the Rams would again win a conference regular season championship.

Background

Roster 

Updated: December 7, 2004

Schedule 

|-
!colspan=8 style=""| Regular season
|-

|-
!colspan=8 style=""| CAA Tournament
|-

|-
!colspan=8 style=""| NCAA Tournament
|-

Rankings

References 

 VCU Rams 2004 schedule and results
http://grfx.cstv.com/photos/schools/rich/sports/m-soccer/auto_pdf/VCURelease.pdf
https://collegian.richmond.edu/?a=d&d=COL20040930.2.40

VCU Rams men's soccer seasons
VCU
VCU Rams men's soccer
Vcu
VCU